Noël-Nicolas Coypel (17 November 1690 – 14 December 1734) was a popular French artist.

The son of Noël Coypel and half-brother to the more-famous painter Antoine Coypel, he was accredited to the Academie Royale in 1716.  He was appointed a professorship in 1733, but died shortly thereafter in a domestic accident.

References

Further reading
Primary sources
 
General studies
 
 
 
Reference books
 
 
 
 
 

1690 births
1734 deaths
18th-century French painters
French male painters
Accidental deaths in France
18th-century French male artists